Stavros Zurukzoglu (5 April 1896 – 26 November 1966) was an influential Swiss eugenicist.

In 1927 he got his Ph.D. in Medicine, he later became professor of bacteriology and hygiene at the University of Bern. In 1956 he was appointed honorary professor of social hygiene and eugenics.

Further reading 
 Ziegler, Beatrice. Verhinderte Wissenschaft? Universität und Eugenik in der Schweiz am Beispiel der Laufbahn von Stravros Zurukzoglu in Bern. Lecture held at the round table IV. Psychiatrists, Eugenicists: Biographies, Careers, Impact on February 20, 2002, led by Prof. Doris Kaufmann. Interdisziplinäre Tagung Psychiatrie und Eugenik im 19. und 20. Jahrhundert: Die Schweiz im europäisch-amerikanischen Kontext. Centro Stefano Franscini, Monte Verità, Ascona, February 17–22, 2002.
 , Sevasti: Anthropological Discourse and Eugenics in Interwar Greece. In: Turda, Marius and Weindling, Paul J. (editors): Eugenics and Racial Nationalism in Central and Southeast Europe, 1900–1940. Central European University Press, Budapest 2007, p. 123–144. (S. 130 online)

References

1896 births
1966 deaths
Academic staff of the University of Bern
Swiss eugenicists
Turkish people of Greek descent
Turkish emigrants to Switzerland